Nesselsdorf (NW) type T was a luxury car. As the company changed its name the model was renamed to Tatra 20 in 1919. It was successor to the highly successful model NW type S. It was made at the same time as NW type U until 1925, when both of the models were replaced by Tatra 17. It is currently a vintage model, with only three examples known to exist. BMW owns one, while another is owned by a U.S. car collector.

Design

Engine
The engine NW T was a four stroke OHC water cooled inline four. The first T20s had to be started manually while later T20s had Bosch electric starters. The same engine was also used in NW TL-2 and NW TL-4 trucks.

Chassis
The car had solid front and rear axles suspended on leaf springs and rear wheel drive.

Versions
The car was gradually modernized - for instance, the manual starter was replaced by an electrical one, the gearstick was moved inside the car, front brakes  were added, etcetera. It was sold mostly as a luxurious limousine, although other variants were also made, such as an ambulance and a racing version.

External links
 Tatraportakl.sk - Tatra 20

20
Cars introduced in 1914
1920s cars
Cars of the Czech Republic